Durham is an unincorporated community in eastern Washington County, Arkansas, United States. The community is on Arkansas Highway 16 along the White River valley between Elkins to the northwest and Thompson in Madison County to the southeast.

A post office was established at Durham in 1873, and remained in operation until 1967. The Durham School, which is listed on the National Register of Historic Places, was located here.

Notable person
Sherm Lollar, professional baseball player and coach

References

Unincorporated communities in Arkansas
Unincorporated communities in Washington County, Arkansas
1873 establishments in Arkansas